Corymbia cliftoniana is a species of tree that is endemic to northern Australia. It has thick, rough, tessellated bark on the trunk and branches, narrow lance-shaped adult leaves, flower buds in groups of seven, creamy white flowers and shortened spherical fruit.

Description
It has thick, rough, tessellated, flaky bark on the trunk and branches. Flowering occurs in January and the flowers are creamy white.

Taxonomy and naming
This eucalypt was first formally described in 1919 by William Vincent Fitzgerald in Joseph Maiden's book A Critical Revision of the Genus Eucalyptus and given the name Eucalyptus cliftoniana. In 1995 Kenneth Hill and Lawrence Alexander Sidney Johnson changed the name to Corymbia cliftoniana in the journal Telopea. The specific epithet (cliftoniana) honours R.C. Clifton, a Western Australian public servant.

Distribution and habitat
Corymbia cliftoniana grows on sandstone and limestone cliffs and escarpments from near Derby in the Kimberley region of Western Australia to the Victoria River region of the Northern Territory. It is common in the Bungle Bungle Range.

See also
 List of Corymbia species

References

cliftoniana
Myrtales of Australia
Rosids of Western Australia
Flora of the Northern Territory
Plants described in 1919
Taxa named by William Vincent Fitzgerald